"Rap Saved Me" is a song by Atlanta-based rapper 21 Savage, American rapper Offset, and American record producer Metro Boomin from their collaborative studio album Without Warning (2017). It features American rapper Quavo.

Composition
The production in the song contains synthesized strings, which Marshall Gu of Pretty Much Amazing described as "sounding like squeaky metal". The song revolves around the rappers' lifestyle of luxury goods, as they make references to items such as French couture, Swiss watches, and Austrian firearms.

Critical reception
Sheldon Pearce of Pitchfork praised the "understated tectonic shift" within the instrumental during Offset's2 verse, as one of the signs of the production's "balance between ghostly and ghastly" throughout Without Warning.

Charts

Certifications

References

2017 songs
21 Savage songs
Offset (rapper) songs
Metro Boomin songs
Quavo songs
Songs written by 21 Savage
Songs written by Offset (rapper)
Songs written by Metro Boomin
Songs written by Quavo
Song recordings produced by Metro Boomin